Vincent Philippe Antoine Candela (born 24 October 1973) is a French former professional footballer. Candela was with the France national team hat won the 1998 FIFA World Cup and UEFA Euro 2000.

Early life
Candela was born in Bédarieux, Hérault.

Club career
At club level, Candela played football in France with Toulouse (1992–95) and Guingamp (1995–97), before moving to Italian side A.S. Roma (1997–2005). He won one scudetto with Roma, as well as the Supercoppa Italiana, in 2001, also helping the club to the 2003 Coppa Italia Final. He later joined English side Bolton Wanderers (2005), before returning to Italy to play for Udinese (2005–2006), and Siena (2006–2007), as well as spending a spell on loan with Messina (2007). On 28 January 2007 he played his last Serie A match for Messina against Ascoli.

International career
For France, Candela was capped 40 times between 1996 and 2003, scoring five goals. His playing time was often limited by Bixente Lizarazu, but he did play in one match during France's 1998 FIFA World Cup triumph on home soil. During France's triumphant Euro 2000 campaign, Candela played two matches, both as a starter. He also played for France at the 1996 Summer Olympic Games, and at the 2002 FIFA World Cup.

International goals
Scores and results list France's goal tally first, score column indicates score after each Candela goal.

Style of play
Candela was a quick, offensive-minded, and technically skilled left wingback, who was effective at joining the attack as well as being capable in defence, due to his intelligence and tenacity. Although he preferred playing on the left flank, he was naturally right-footed, and was also capable of playing on the right, both as a full-back, and as a winger, and was an accurate crosser and set-piece taker.

Honours
Guingamp
UEFA Intertoto Cup: 1996

Roma
Serie A: 2000–01
Supercoppa Italiana: 2001

France
FIFA World Cup: 1998
UEFA European Championship: 2000

Individual
A.S. Roma Hall of Fame: 2014

Orders
Knight of the Legion of Honour: 1998

References

External links

Bolton Wanderers Profile at Burnden Aces

1973 births
Living people
People from Bédarieux
Sportspeople from Hérault
French footballers
France under-21 international footballers
France international footballers
Association football defenders
Ligue 1 players
Toulouse FC players
En Avant Guingamp players
A.S. Roma players
Premier League players
Bolton Wanderers F.C. players
A.C.N. Siena 1904 players
A.C.R. Messina players
Udinese Calcio players
Serie A players
Expatriate footballers in England
Expatriate footballers in Italy
French expatriate footballers
Olympic footballers of France
Footballers at the 1996 Summer Olympics
1998 FIFA World Cup players
UEFA Euro 2000 players
2002 FIFA World Cup players
FIFA World Cup-winning players
UEFA European Championship-winning players
Chevaliers of the Légion d'honneur
Footballers from Occitania (administrative region)